Roaming is a Canadian film written and directed by Michael Ray Fox and produced by Michael Melski, Richard MacQueen, and Craig Cameron. The film features Rhys Bevan-John, Cory Bowles, Daniel Lillford, Martha Irving, Josh MacDonald, Sarah D. McCarthy, and Christina Cuffari. Roaming was the first film to be produced through Telefilm Canada's First Feature Program.

Release 
Roaming opened the 2013 Toronto Independent Film Festival and was the Closing Night film of the Silver Wave Film Festival in New Brunswick.  The film was distributed in Canada by Multiple Media Entertainment and All Channel Films and was released on Hulu, Indieflix, The Movie Network, Hollywood Suite, Bell TV OnDemand, and the National Film Board of Canada Canada Screens website. The film originally premiered at the 2012 Atlantic Film Festival.

Reception 
Roaming received generally positive reviews during its limited theatrical engagement exclusive to Atlantic Canada and received an award for Best Feature at the Toronto Independent Film Festival in 2013. Lead actor Rhys Bevan-John received the ACTRA Maritimes Award for Outstanding Male Performance for his portrayal of Will. Josh MacDonald was nominated for the same award for his performance in Roaming and Martha Irving's performance in the film earned her an ACTRA Maritimes Award nomination for Outstanding Female Performance.

References

http://www.thecoast.ca/halifax/roaming-on-set-report/Content?oid=3083482
http://playbackonline.ca/.../michael-ray-foxs-first-feature-is-roaming-in-halifax/
http://www.rottentomatoes.com/m/roaming/

External links

2012 films
English-language Canadian films
Films shot in Nova Scotia
2012 romantic drama films
Canadian romantic drama films
2010s English-language films
2010s Canadian films